Chaetodellus is a genus of mites in the family Pachylaelapidae. There are at least two described species in Chaetodellus.

Species
These two species belong to the genus Chaetodellus:
 Chaetodellus comatus Mašán & Halliday, 2013
 Chaetodellus meganalis (Halliday, 2005)

References

Acari